Pejeng is a village in Bali, Indonesia, in the Petanu River valley. It is a bit east of Ubud in Gianyar Regency. It is home to the Moon of Pejeng, the largest single-cast bronze kettle drum in the world. Pejeng is a rural area with extensive, and ancient, irrigated rice cultivation.

References

 

Populated places in Bali
Gianyar Regency